Shamil Gasanovich Burziyev (1 April 1985 – 5 December 2010) was a Russian professional football player.

Club career
Dagestan- born Burziyev played the majority of his career in the lower leagues of Russian football. With Anzhi he also featured in the Russian Premier League and helped them to avoid relegation after reaching the 12th Spot in the Russian Premier League in 2010.

He died in a car accident. The 25-year-old had been returning to Makhachkala when he lost control of his car, sending it off the road. The incident occurred on the Rostov to Baku main road.

Burzi and his friend were killed on the impact of the crash, while another person was in a critical condition in hospital.

References

External links
 

1985 births
2010 deaths
People from Buynaksk
Russian footballers
Association football midfielders
FC Anzhi Makhachkala players
FC Chernomorets Novorossiysk players
FC Dynamo Stavropol players
FC Fakel Voronezh players
Russian Premier League players
Road incident deaths in Russia
FC Dynamo Makhachkala players
Sportspeople from Dagestan
20th-century Russian people
21st-century Russian people